The Fundamentalist Presbyterian General Assembly in Korea was founded in 1983 by Pastor Yum Haeng-Soo and Pastor Hwang Oh-Gyo. The reason of the founding a new denominations that they believed that Korean churches were bowing to mammonism, secularism, syncretism and had to return the main tenets of the Bible.Yum Haeng-Soo begun to promote fundamental Reformed theology.
In 2004 it had 70,000 members in 216 congregations. It subscribes the Apostles Creed and the Westminster Confession.

References 

Presbyterian denominations in South Korea
Presbyterian denominations in Asia
Fundamentalist denominations